Michal Šneberger (born 23 June 1978, in Plzeň) is a Czech middle distance runner.

Achievements

References

1978 births
Living people
Czech male middle-distance runners
Olympic athletes of the Czech Republic
Athletes (track and field) at the 2004 Summer Olympics
Sportspeople from Plzeň